Harendra Chitra College, Bhaktardoba is an undergraduate college established in the year 1992 at Bhaktardoba of Barpeta district in Assam. The college is affiliated to Gauhati University.

About 
Harendra Chitra College, Bhaktardoba (affiliated by Gauhati University) began life as an institution of higher education from 1992 to 1993 under Barpeta District located centrally in wide area which accommodates 3 (Three) Mauzas Paka Mauza, Betbari Mouza and Sarukhetri Mauza under Barpeta District.

References 

Colleges in Assam